The Guide is a 1958 novel written in English by the Indian author R. K. Narayan. Like most of his works, the novel is based on Malgudi, the fictional town in South India. The novel describes the transformation of the protagonist, Raju, from a tour guide to a spiritual guide and then one of the greatest holy men of India.

The novel earned Narayan the 1960 Sahitya Akademi Award for English, by the Sahitya Akademi, India's National Academy of Letters. In 2022, it was included on the "Big Jubilee Read" list of 70 books by Commonwealth authors, selected to celebrate the Platinum Jubilee of Elizabeth II.

Plot summary
Raju, nicknamed as "Railway Raju", is a corrupt and popular tour guide. He falls in love with a beautiful dancer, Rosie, the wife of an archaeologist, Marco, who are both visiting Malgudi as tourists. Marco does not approve of Rosie's passion for dancing. Rosie, encouraged by Raju, decides to follow her dreams and embarks on a dancing career. In the process, they start to grow close to each other. On learning of their relationship, Marco leaves Rosie in Malgudi and goes back to Madras alone. Rosie turns up at Raju's home and they start living together. Raju's mother, however, does not approve of their relationship and leaves them.  

Raju becomes Rosie's stage manager and soon, with the help of Raju's marketing tactics, Rosie becomes a successful dancer. Raju, however, develops an inflated sense of self-importance and tries to control her life. He wants to earn as much wealth as possible. Raju gets involved in a case of forgery of Rosie's signature and gets a two-year sentence despite Rosie's best efforts to save him. After completing the sentence, Raju passes through a village, Mangal, where he is mistaken for a sadhu (a spiritual guide). Since he does not want to return in disgrace to Malgudi, he decides to stay in an abandoned temple, in close proximity to Mangal. There, he plays the role of a sadhu, delivering sermons and discourses to the villagers and solving their day-to-day problems and disputes.  

Some time later, there is a famine in the village and villagers somehow get the idea that Raju will keep a fast in order to make it rain. Raju confesses the entire truth about his past to Velan, who had first discovered Raju in the temple and had developed faith in him like the rest of the villagers. The confession does not make a difference to Velan, and Raju decides to go on with the fast. With media publicizing his fast, a huge crowd gathers (much to Raju's resentment) to watch him fast. In the morning of the eleventh day of fasting, he goes to the riverside as part of his daily ritual. He feels that the rain is falling in the hills in the distance, and he sags down in water. It is unknown and unconfirmed whether it rained, or whether Raju died. It is left up to interpretation of the reader.

Adaptations

The film Guide was released in 1965, based on the novel. It was directed by Vijay Anand. It starred Dev Anand as Raju, Waheeda Rehman as Rosie, and Leela Chitnis in the lead roles. The film's score was composed by S. D. Burman. The movie's ending differs from that of the novel, in which the fate of some characters remain unanswered.

A 120-minute U.S. version was written by Pearl S. Buck, and directed and produced by Tad Danielewski. The film was screened at the 2007 Cannes Film Festival, 42 years after its release.

The novel was also adapted into a play in 1968. The play was profiled in the William Goldman book The Season: A Candid Look at Broadway.

References

External links 
 Study guide
 An analysis
 Some thoughts about the novel at Let's talk about Bollywood

1958 Indian novels
1958 novels
Indian novels adapted into films
Methuen Publishing books
Novels by R. K. Narayan
Novels set in India
Philosophical novels
Sahitya Akademi Award-winning works
Viking Press books